Jonesboro or Jonesborough is the name of a number of settlements in the United States and the United Kingdom:

United States

Jonesboro, Arkansas
Jonesboro massacre, a school shooting incident
Jonesboro, Georgia, originally Jonesborough
Battle of Jonesborough, final battle of the Atlanta Campaign
Jonesboro, Illinois, site of the third of the Lincoln–Douglas debates
Jonesboro, Indiana
Jonesboro, Louisiana
Jonesboro, Maine
Jonesboro, Ohio
Jonesboro, Oregon
Jonesborough, Tennessee, "Tennessee's oldest town"

United Kingdom

Jonesborough, County Armagh, a small village in Northern Ireland